Omman (also Romanized as ‘Ommān) is a village in Darjazin-e Sofla Rural District, Qorveh-e Darjazin District, Razan County, Hamadan Province, Iran. At the 2006 census, its population was 1,936, in 480 families.

References 

Populated places in Razan County